Kohan Retail Investment Group is a shopping mall investment company based in Great Neck, New York. They primarily purchase endangered/troubled shopping malls.

History
Kohan bought Northland Mall from Developers Diversified Realty for $1.8 million in late December 2008. Kohan purchased the Jamestown Mall in 2009 for $3.3 million. Staunton Mall was purchased from bankrupt First Republic Realty for $4.05 million in November 2010. In April 2011, Warren Mall was sold by Zamias for $720,000, and in April 2016 was under the ownership of Cocca Development. Lincoln Mall was purchased during foreclosure for $150,000 in June 2012, with millions owed in fines and taxes from its previous owners. Crystal River Mall was purchased for $2.8 million in 2012, and would be sold to United Realty M.T.A. LLC in August 2016. Tiffin Mall, purchased in 2012, was later sold to Key Hotel and Property Management in 2016 for $2.2 million. Macerich sold Rotterdam Square Mall to Kohan for $8.5 million on January 15, 2014. Lake Square Mall was purchased in March 2014 for $13.28 million, but would be sold to Via Properties in September with Kohan remaining manager. Staunton Mall was sold for $4.5 million in March 2014. The Orchards Mall, purchased in 2014, was sold to Durga LLC in late 2018.

PREIT sold Lycoming Mall to Kohan for $26.35 million in March 2016, who owns it under the name Lycoming Mall Realty Holding. Washington Square Mall was purchased in April 2016 for $2.5 million. Chapel Hill Mall was purchased in July 2016 by Kohan for $8.6 million. Southbridge Mall during its tax sale was purchased by Kohan for $1.5 million in September 2016. Also in September 2016, Kohan purchased Berkshire Mall for $3.5 million. Richmond Town Square was purchased for $7.25 million in November 2016. Kohan purchased six malls in 2018 for $46 million. Part of Eastland Center was purchased in 2018 for $3.125 million. Prescott Gateway Mall was sold to Kohan for $8.8 million in February 2018, half of what the previous owners purchased it for. Towne Square Mall and additional properties were purchased for $4 million in May 2018. The Esplanade in June 2018 was purchased by Kohan for $9.25 million. Valle Vista Mall was purchased for $12.5 million in mid-2018. Fort Steuben Mall was purchased for $10.75 million in December 2018.

Parts of Marquette, Michigan's Westwood Mall was sold to two different owners in February 2019, one being Kohan. Berkshire Mall was sold to Durga Property Holdings for $1 million in July 2019. Towne West Square was purchased for $14 million in July 2019. Towne Square Mall was sold for $5.15 million to Towne Square Mall Holdings LLC in December 2019. Village Square Mall was sold to Durga Property Holdings in early 2020. Ashtabula Towne Square and other properties was purchased for $10.2 million in February 2020. Ownership of the Seminole Towne Center was transferred to Kohan in March 2020. Virginia Center Commons was sold to VCC Partners LLC and Shamin VCC LLC in early 2020 for $8.3 million. Kohan later sold another Virginia Center Commons anchor building for $4.1 million to Impact Investments Group LLC in April 2020. Clearview Mall in Butler, PA was taken over by Kohan in June 2020. Findlay Village Mall was sold to Kohan for $4 million in September 2020. Kohan purchased the Burnsville Center's debt at auction for $18 million in October 2020.

The Outlets of Little Rock were purchased for $10 million in January 2021. Central Mall Lawton was sold to Lawton, Oklahoma for $14.6 million in January 2021. Prizm Outlets was purchased by Kohan at auction for $1.525 million in January 2021. Kohan purchased both the Birchwood Mall and Westwood Mall in February 2021, paying $5.6 million for Birchwood. Chapel Hill Mall was sold by Kohan to Industrial Commercial Properties in March 2021. Lansing Mall was purchased for $9.2 million in March 2021. Oak View Mall was purchased for $7.5 million in April 2021. McKinley Mall was sold to Kohan for $8.5 million in July 2021 despite protests from local business and government about the sale price. Wyoming Valley Mall was sold to Kohan for $17 million in August 2021. Kohan purchased the Triangle Town Center for $33.25 million in November 2021. Montgomery Mall while in foreclosure was purchased for $55 million in November 2021.

The Crossroads in Portage, Michigan was purchased by Kohan in January 2022 for $25 million. NorthTown Mall was purchased for $49 million in February 2022. Part of the Burnsville Center was sold to Pacific Square Burnsville LLC for $10.6 million in February 2022. Fort Steuben Mall was sold by Kohan to Brookwood Capital in February 2022. Brass Mill Center and Brass City Commons was sold to Kohan for $44.9 million in April 2022. Indiana Mall was purchased in April 2022 for $6.9 million. Fashion Square Mall was purchased at auction in September 2022 for $10.8 million. In November 2022, PREIT sold Cumberland Mall to Kohan Retail Investment Group for $45 million. The Mall at Robinson was purchased for $46 million from QIC in November 2022. Santa Fe Place was acquired in January 2023.

Controversies
Kohan lost the Jamestown Mall in late 2011 due to foreclosure, but retained some ownership in late 2012. The mall had previously declared bankruptcy in August 2011. After purchasing Woodville Mall in 2009, it was closed in December 2011 by court order, and demolished by Northwood, Ohio in March 2014 due to its poor material condition. Lincoln Mall suffered from serious material condition issues during Kohan's ownership and in August 2013 went into receivership. Matteson, Illinois took over ownership in June 2014 and it closed in January 2015 after running out of money. At the malls closure, over $10 million in fines and taxes was owed to Matteson by Kohan. Lincoln Mall was demolished starting in May 2017. During a 2013 police drug search, serious issues were discovered in Northland Mall's former Kmart that included mold, roof damage, and other major issues. Ownership also owed $141,081.61 in taxes to Nobles County, Minnesota. The mall had serious material condition issues in April 2014 that Worthington, Minnesota took action on. Worthington won a court decision about the former Kmart in June 2014, and demolition began in February 2015. The mall was sold to 7&41 LLC in May 2015.

Due to lack of payment on a $300,000 bill, Rotterdam Square Mall lost power on February 12, 2015. The mall was later sold to ViaPort USA for $9.25 million. Since its purchase, Berkshire Mall has suffered from serious tax issues with many payments being missed. Kohan has been taken to court several times over these issues and has narrowly avoided Berkshire's seizure. Berkshire has also suffered from a series of power outages. Kohan owed $627,789 in property taxes on the Washington Square Mall in 2017, and the mall was put up for tax sale. The malls outstanding taxes were paid off in October 2018 for $1.1 million. VF Factory Outlet Mall closed in October 2017. Indian River Mall almost lost power in December 2017 due to unpaid electric bills and bounced checks totaling $428,175. The bill was paid the day electric was to be shutoff.

Mayberry Mall was almost closed on February 1, 2018 by local government officials due to roof and mold issues. It was sold to WRS Inc. Real Estate Investments in 2019. In August 2018, Kohan sued Clay, New York for a reduction in the Great Northern Mall's taxes, while owing $1.53 million to county government. Due to the roofs poor condition, Effingham City declared Village Square Mall unsafe in August 2018. Due to Kohan not paying Lycoming Mall's PPL electric bill, it lost power in late August 2018. In September 2018, Southbridge Mall was sued by Cerro Gordo County for $177,324 in back taxes. Those taxes were paid off in December 2018, with three of the previous four checks sent to the county bouncing. Kohan owed around $550,000 on The Orchards Mall in various taxes before its sale in late 2018.

Lycoming County Water and Sewer Authority placed Lycoming Mall on the February 2019 sheriff's sale list due to unpaid bills. Kohan made a partial payment to stop the auction. Chapel Hill Mall almost had power disconnected by Ohio Edison due to unpaid bills in April and December 2019. Tulsa Promenade was placed into receivership in July 2019 due to missed mortgage payments and maintenance issues. Kohan resumed ownership of the mall in September. Chapel Hill Mall in January 2020 was foreclosed on by Summit County, Ohio for owing $753,732.82 in real estate taxes. The mall also had electric and water payment issues the same month. Adrian Mall in March 2020 was almost condemned due to electrical, roof, and structural issues. It was later condemned in June 2020 due to numerous serious issues.

Kohan in March 2021 owed $320,000 in back taxes on The Esplanade. During Jefferson Parish, Louisiana's investigation, it was discovered that additional taxes from 1992 were not paid on the vacant Macy's anchor building, resulting in Kohan owing another $480,000. Parts of the property later went up for tax sale, were not sold, and the assets transferred to Jefferson Parish. The mall would close in later 2021 due to the effects of Hurricane Ida. Great Northern Mall was closed for month in January and February 2022 due to repairs for frozen pipes. Kohan also owes almost $5 million in back taxes on the property. Lycoming County Water and Sewer Authority again placed Lycoming Mall on the May 2022 sheriff's sale list due to unpaid bills. Kohan paid almost $300,000 in unpaid bills and fees to avoid the sheriff's sale.

In February 2023, the Aroostook Centre Mall in Presque Isle, Maine was closed after Kohan's local employee advised tenant's that Kohan had not been paying utility bills and he was unable to get in contact with the corporate office.

List of mall properties
Mall properties owned by Kohan Retail Investment Group as of 2022 include:

List of properties with unclear ownership
 Adrian Mall, Adrian, Michigan

List of former mall properties
Properties previously owned by Kohan Retail Investment Group as of 2022 include:

List of hotels
Mall properties hotels by Kohan Retail Investment Group as of 2022 include:

Notes

References

External links
Official website

 
Great Neck Peninsula
Companies based in Nassau County, New York
Shopping center management firms
Real estate companies established in 2008